Marvee Lou Leelin-Cruz (born August 8, 1979), better known as Bamba Leelin, was a former child actress, model, and producer in the Philippines. She won the 1986 FAMAS Awards for Best Child Actress in the movie Moomoo.

Career 
Her first film was Moomoo (1985) with Gloria Diaz and Eddie Rodriguez. She played as one of the children of Carding (played by Ronald Corveau) and Luisa (played by Marianne dela Riva) of Gulong ng Palad on television.

She became a famous child star of the 1980s along with Lady Lee, RR Herrera, Chuckie Dreyfus, Jaypee de Guzman, Rose Ann Gonzales, Glaiza Herradura, Matet de Leon, and Aiza Seguerra, among others.

Her other projects were Barbi: Maid in the Philippines (1989) with Joey de Leon and Petrang Kabayo at ang Pilyang Kuting (1990) with Roderick Paulate, among others.

She became a member of That's Entertainment, her batchmates were Ara Mina and Patricia Javier.

Personal life
She left That's Entertainment for school. She finished a degree in Production Design. She married Jay Tan Cruz in 2005, and has a daughter, Jaela Leelin Cruz.

Filmography
Moomoo (1985)
Tuklaw (1986)
Once Upon a Time (1987)
Bunsong Kerubin (1987)
No Retreat... No Surrender... Si Kumander (1987)
1 + 1 = 12 (+ 1): One Plus One Equals Twelve (Cheaper by the Dozen) (1987)
Love Boat: Mahal Trip Kita (1988)
Nakausap Ko ang Birhen (1988)
Love Letters (1988)
One Day, Isang Araw (1988)
Petrang Kabayo at ang Pilyang Kuting (1988)
Sheman: Mistress of the Universe (1988)
Barbi: Maid in the Philippines (1989)
Bote, Dyaryo, Garapa (1989)
Pulis Pulis sa Ilalim ng Tulay (1989)
Captain Yagit (1989)
Pido Dida 3: May Kambal Na (1993)

References

External links

Living people
20th-century Filipino actresses
Filipino child actresses
That's Entertainment (Philippine TV series)
Actresses from Manila
1979 births